Air Force Materiel Command (AFMC) is a major command (MAJCOM) of the United States Air Force (USAF). AFMC was created on July 1, 1992, through the amalgamation of the former Air Force Logistics Command (AFLC) and the former Air Force Systems Command (AFSC).

AFMC is headquartered at Wright-Patterson Air Force Base in Dayton, Ohio. AFMC is one of nine Air Force Major Commands and has a workforce of approximately 80,000 military and civilian personnel. It is the Air Force's largest command in terms of funding and second in terms of personnel. AFMC's operating budget represents 31 percent of the total Air Force budget and AFMC employs more than 40 percent of the Air Force's total civilian workforce.

The command conducts research, development, testing and evaluation, and provides the acquisition and life cycle management services and logistics support. The command develops, acquires and sustains the air power needed to defend the United States and its interests. This is accomplished through research, development, testing, evaluation, acquisition, maintenance and program management of existing and future USAF weapon systems and their components.

History 
The United States Armed Forces procurement of military aircraft began when the United States Army's Aeronautical Division of the Signal Corps (United States Army), acquired several examples of the Wright Military Flyer of 1909. USAAF/USAF aircraft Research and Development (R&D) was merged with aircraft procurement twice in the 20th century (e.g., 1944, 1992).

Air Materiel Command was established on March 9, 1946, and in November 1946, AMC's History Office published Materiel Research and Development in the Army Air Arm, 1914-1945. In 1947, AMC bases were transferred to the newly established United States Air Force, with facilities such as the storage depot in Maywood, California, being renamed Cheli Air Force Station.

On April 1, 1961, as part of the DoD reorganization under President John F. Kennedy and his Secretary of Defense, Robert S. McNamara, the Air Force Logistics Command was established at Wright-Patterson Air Force Base, replacing the Air Materiel Command and assuming the latter's supply and maintenance roles. The material procurement role was transferred.  On the same date, Air Force Systems Command was also established at Andrews Air Force Base, Maryland, assuming the R&D role of the former Air Research and Development Command while also inheriting AMC's materiel procurement role.

Activation duties AFMC, 1992 
Air Force Materiel Command (AFMC) was activated on July 1, 1992, as part of a post-Cold War, USAF-wide reorganization that resulted in the merger of AFLC and AFSC into a single major command.

After AFMC was established, the command's infrastructure saw significant reductions through Base Realignment and Closure (BRAC) actions. This included the BRAC-directed closure/privatization of the San Antonio Air Logistics Center at Kelly Air Force Base, Texas and the closure of Kelly Air Force Base as an independent installation, with incorporation of its runways and remaining military flight line areas as the Kelly Field Annex to adjacent Lackland Air Force Base.

The Sacramento Air Logistics Center at McClellan Air Force Base was also closed/privatized and McClellan Air Force Base totally closed. McClellan became a totally civilian airport with the exception of Coast Guard Air Station Sacramento and the Air Force Recruiting Service's 364th Recruiting Squadron.

Reorganization 
In 2012 there was a major reorganization (5 Center Construct) and several new centers were organized. Among them, the Air Force Sustainment Center at Tinker Air Force Base now directs the Oklahoma City Air Logistics Complex at Tinker Air Force Base, the Ogden Air Logistics Complex at Hill Air Force Base, and the Warner Robins Air Logistics Complex at Robins Air Force Base. The center provides depot maintenance, supply chain management and installation support. In 2015, the command officially activated its sixth center, the Air Force Installation and Mission Support Center, which provides centralized management of installation and mission support. The center is located at Joint Base San Antonio, Texas.

Mission 
Air Force Materiel Command conducts research, development, test and evaluation, and provides acquisition management services and logistics support.

AFMC headquarters is the major unit located at Wright-Patterson Air Force Base, Ohio. There are also nine additional AFMC host bases.

In addition, the command operates associate units and tenant activities on several non-AFMC bases, including the Air Force Nuclear Weapons Center at Kirtland Air Force Base, New Mexico.

Component units

Headquarters 

 Headquarters Air Force Materiel Command (Wright-Patterson AFB, Ohio)

Air Force Installation and Mission Support Center 

The Air Force Installation and Mission Support Center (AFIMSC) serves as the single intermediate-level headquarters responsible for providing installation and mission support capabilities. Its headquarters are located at Joint Base San Antonio-Lackland, Texas and it has the following subordinate units.

 Air Force Civil Engineer Center (Joint Base San Antonio-Lackland, Texas)
Air Force Financial Management Center of Expertise (Buckley Space Force Base, Colorado)
Air Force Financial Services Center (Ellsworth AFB, South Dakota)
 Air Force Installation Contracting Center (Wright-Patterson AFB, Ohio)
 Air Force Security Forces Center (Joint Base Antonio-Lackland, Texas)
 Air Force Services Center (Joint Base San Antonio-Lackland, Texas)

Air Force Life Cycle Management Center 

The Air Force Life Cycle Management Center's (AFLCMC) mission is to deliver affordable and sustainable combat capabilities to US and international partners. It is the single center responsible for total life cycle management of all aircraft, engines, munitions, and electronic systems. Its headquarters are located at Wright-Patterson AFB, Ohio and it has the following subordinate units.

 66th Air Base Group (Hanscom AFB, Massachusetts)
 88th Air Base Wing (Wright-Patterson AFB, Ohio)
 Acquisition Excellence Directorate (Wright-Patterson AFB, Ohio)
 Agile Combat Support Directorate (Wright-Patterson AFB, Ohio)
 Air Force Security Assistance & Cooperation Directorate (Wright-Patterson AFB, Ohio)
 Armament Directorate (Eglin AFB, Florida)
 Bombers Directorate (Wright-Patterson AFB, Ohio)
 Business & Enterprise Systems Directorate (Gunter Annex, Maxwell AFB, Alabama)
 Command, Control, Communications and Intelligence (C3I) and Networks Directorate
 Digital Directorate (Hanscom AFB, Massachusetts)
 Fighters & Advanced Aircraft Directorate (Wright-Patterson AFB, Ohio)
 Intelligence, Surveillance and Reconnaissance (ISR) and Special Operations Force (SOF) Directorate (Wright-Patterson AFB, Ohio)
 Mobility & Training Aircraft Directorate (Wright-Patterson AFB, Ohio)
 Presidential and Executive Airlift Directorate (Wright-Patterson AFB, Ohio)
 Program Execution Directorate (Wright-Patterson AFB, Ohio)
 Propulsion Directorate (Tinker AFB, Oklahoma)
 Rapid Sustainment Directorate (Wright-Patterson AFB, Ohio)

Air Force Nuclear Weapons Center 

The Air Force Nuclear Weapons Center (AFNWC) is the Air Force's nuclear-focused center,  synchronizing all aspects of nuclear materiel management in support of Air Force Global Strike Command. Its headquarters are located at Kirtland AFB, New Mexico and it has the following subordinate units.

 Air-Delivered Capabilities Directorate (Kirtland AFB)
 Ground Based Strategic Deterrent Systems Directorate (Hill AFB, Utah)
 Minuteman III Systems Directorate (Hill AFB, Utah)
 Nuclear Command, Control, and Communications (NC3) Integration Directorate (Hanscom AFB, Massachusetts)
 Nuclear Technology and Integration Directorate (Kirtland AFB)

Air Force Research Laboratory 

The Air Force Research Laboratory (AFRL) is the Air Force's only organization dedicated to leading the discovery, development and integration of technologies in air, space and cyber for the US Air and Space Forces. Its headquarters are located at Wright-Patterson AFB, Ohio and it has the following subordinate units.

 711th Human Performance Wing (Wright-Patterson AFB, Ohio)
 Aerospace Systems Directorate (Wright-Patterson AFB, Ohio)
 Air Force Office of Scientific Research (Arlington, Virginia)
Air Force Strategic Development Planning and Experimentation Office (Wright-Patterson AFB, Ohio)
Directed Energy Directorate (Kirtland AFB, New Mexico)
 Information Directorate (Rome Research Site, New York)
 Materials and Manufacturing Directorate (Wright-Patterson AFB, Ohio)
 Munitions Directorate (Eglin AFB, Florida)
 Sensors Directorate (Wright-Patterson AFB, Ohio)
 Space Vehicles (Kirtland AFB, New Mexico)

Air Force Sustainment Center 
The mission of the Air Force Sustainment Center (AFSC) is to provide sustainment and logistics readiness. The center provides integrated logistics and sustainment to the Air Force through depot maintenance, supply chain management and installation support. Its headquarters are located at Tinker Air Force Base, Oklahoma and it has the following subordinate units.

 72nd Air Base Wing (Tinker Air Force Base, Oklahoma)
 75th Air Base Wing (Hill Air Force Base, Utah)
 78th Air Base Wing (Robins Air Force Base, Georgia)
 448th Supply Chain Management Wing (Tinker Air Force Base, Oklahoma)
 635th Supply Chain Operations Wing (Scott AFB, Illinois)
 Ogden Air Logistics Complex (Hill Air Force Base, Utah)
 Oklahoma City Air Logistics Complex (Tinker Air Force Base, Oklahoma)
 Warner Robins Air Logistics Complex (Robins Air Force Base, Georgia)

Air Force Test Center 

The Air Force Test Center (AFTC) conducts developmental and follow-on testing and evaluation of manned and unmanned aircraft and related avionics, flight-control, munitions, and weapon systems. Its headquarters are located at Edwards AFB, California and it has the following subordinate units.

 96th Test Wing (Eglin AFB, Florida)
 412th Test Wing (Edwards AFB, California)
 Arnold Engineering Development Complex (Arnold AFB, Tennessee)

Other units 

 National Museum of the US Air Force (Wright-Patterson AFB, Ohio)

Commanders

See also
U.S. Armed Forces systems commands
 Army Materiel Command
 Marine Corps Systems Command
 United States Navy systems commands
 Naval Sea Systems Command
 Naval Air Systems Command
 Naval Information Warfare Systems Command
 Naval Facilities Engineering Systems Command
 Naval Supply Systems Command
 Space Systems Command

References

External links

1992 establishments in Ohio
Materiel Command
Materiel Command
Military units and formations in Ohio
Logistics units and formations of the United States Air Force